Eckart-Wilhelm von Bonin (14 November 1919 – 11 January 1992) was a German World War II night fighter pilot who served in the Luftwaffe. A flying ace or fighter ace is a military aviator credited with shooting down five or more enemy aircraft during aerial combat. He is credited with shooting down 37 enemy aircraft claimed during 150 combat missions.

Early life and career
Von Bonin was born on 14 November 1919 in Potsdam in the Province of Brandenburg of the Weimar Republic. He was the son of Bogislaw von Bonin and his wife Mathilde, a daughter of Adolf von Bülow. His older brother, Bogislaw served in the Army and later in the Amt Blank, a predecessor of the Federal Ministry of Defence. Two of his brothers also served in the Luftwaffe, Jürgen-Oskar was killed in action on 8 February 1942 while serving as an observer in a Tansportgeschwader (air transport wing). Another brother, Hubertus, became a fighter pilot and wing commander with 77 aerial victories and was also killed in the war. Von Bonin entered military service with the Luftwaffe in 1937 and was trained as a night fighter pilot.

Night fighter career

Following the 1939 aerial Battle of the Heligoland Bight, RAF attacks shifted to the cover of darkness, initiating the Defence of the Reich campaign. By mid-1940, Generalmajor (Brigadier General) Josef Kammhuber had established a night air defense system dubbed the Kammhuber Line. It consisted of a series of control sectors equipped with radars and searchlights and an associated night fighter. Each sector named a Himmelbett (canopy bed) would direct the night fighter into visual range with target bombers. In 1941, the Luftwaffe started equipping night fighters with airborne radar such as the Lichtenstein radar. This airborne radar did not come into general use until early 1942.

In October 1940, von Bonin was posted to 6. Staffel (6th squadron) of Nachtjagdgeschwader 1 (NJG 1—1st Night Fighter Wing). This squadron was part of II. Gruppe (2nd group) of NJG 1 commanded by Major Walter Ehle.

"Wheels Down" incident
The United States Army Air Forces (USAAF) targeted the German aircraft industry on 17 August 1943 in the Schweinfurt–Regensburg mission. Two Boeing B-17 Flying Fortress bombers from the  4th Bombardment Wing had been forced to leave their formation on their way to Regensburg. The B-17 "Picklepuss" piloted by Captain Robert M. Knox from the 100th Bomb Group headed back to England when it came under attack by three Messerschmitt Bf 110 night fighters south of Aachen. Von Bonin, accompanied by Oberleutnant Walter Barte and Leutnant Hans Witzke had taken off from Sint-Truiden—Saint-Trond in the French pronunciation—to intercept any stragglers to and from the target area. Von Bonin shot down the B-17 on his first attack but one of his engines was also hit be the left waist gunner. While six of the ten crew members of the B-17 were killed in action, von Bonin landed safely on one engine at Saint-Trond.

Following this engagement, controversy arose whether Knox had lowered his landing gear to signal surrender. Apparently, a B-17 had lowered its landing gears and had then shot down one of the escorting Luftwaffe fighters, becoming the "Wheels Down" incident.

Group commander
On 18 November 1943, von Bonin was appointed Gruppenkommandeur (group commander) of II. Gruppe of NJG 1. He succeeded Major Walter Ehle who was killed in action. He was awarded the Knight's Cross of the Iron Cross on 5 February 1944 after 31 aerial victories. In October 1944, he became Gruppenkommandeur of I. Gruppe of Nachtjagdgeschwader 102 (NJG 102—102nd Night Fighter Wing).

Summary of career

Aerial victory claims
According to Obermaier, von Bonin was credited with 37 aerial victories claimed in roughly 150 combat missions. Two of his claims were over four-engined bombers during daytime operations, the other 35 were claimed during nocturnal missions. Aders and Spick list him with 39 aerial victories claimed in approximately 150 combat missions. Foreman, Parry and Mathews, authors of Luftwaffe Night Fighter Claims 1939 – 1945, researched the German Federal Archives and found records for 37 nocturnal victory claims. Mathews and Foreman also published Luftwaffe Aces – Biographies and Victory Claims, listing Von Bonin with 33 aerial victories, plus four further unconfirmed claims.

Awards
 Iron Cross (1939) 2nd and 1st class
 Honour Goblet of the Luftwaffe (Ehrenpokal der Luftwaffe) on 8 May 1943 as Oberleutnant and Staffelkapitän
 German Cross in Gold on 1 August 1943 as Hauptmann in the 6./Nachtjagdgeschweder 1
 Knight's Cross of the Iron Cross on 5 February 1944 as Hauptmann and Gruppenkommandeur of the II./Nachtjagdgeschweder 1

Notes

References

Citations

Bibliography

External links

1919 births
1992 deaths
Luftwaffe pilots
German World War II flying aces
People from the Province of Brandenburg
Recipients of the Gold German Cross
Recipients of the Knight's Cross of the Iron Cross
Military personnel from Potsdam